A forward support battalion was an Army of Excellence combat service support unit designed to support a Brigade.  In divisions, it was part of the Division Support Command (DISCOM).

It was composed of:
 Headquarters & an A company, which provided command, control, and oversight for the battalion & quartermaster support to the brigade. However, the forward support battalions of armored and mechanized brigades would have a separate Headquarters and Headquarters Detachment (HHD) and A company.
 A B company, which provided maintenance support to the brigade both with 3rd Shop, and Maintenance Support Teams attached to the individual battalions.
 A C company, which provided level II medical support to the brigade.

With the conversion to the modular force, the FSBs are being replaced with brigade support battalions (BSBs)

Support battalions of the United States Army